
Gmina Wiązów is an urban-rural gmina (administrative district) in Strzelin County, Lower Silesian Voivodeship, in south-western Poland.

Neighbouring gminas
Gmina Wiązów is bordered by the gminas of Domaniów, Grodków, Oława, Olszanka, Przeworno, Skarbimierz and Strzelin.

Villages
Apart from the town of Wiązów, the gmina contains the villages of Bryłów, Bryłówek, Częstocice, Gułów, Janowo, Jaworów, Jędrzychowice, Jutrzyna, Kalinowa, Kłosów, Kowalów, Krajno, Księżyce, Kucharzowice, Kurów, Kurowskie Chałupy, Łojowice, Miechowice Oławskie, Ośno, Stary Wiązów, Wawrzęcice, Wawrzyszów, Witowice, Wyszonowice and Zborowice.

References

Wiazow
Strzelin County